Gobandawu (Yam) Festival is an annual harvest festival celebrated by the chiefs and people of all traditional areas in the Northern Region of Ghana.

Celebrations 
During the festival, yams and guinea fowls are used as sacrificial offering to in laws.

Significance 
This festival is celebrated to give thanks to the gods for a bumper harvest.

References 

Festivals in Ghana
Northern Region (Ghana)